Joe Foglietta (born 8 March 1966) is an Italian ice hockey player. He competed in the men's tournament at the 1992 Winter Olympics.

References

1966 births
Living people
Italian ice hockey players
Olympic ice hockey players of Italy
Ice hockey players at the 1992 Winter Olympics
Ice hockey people from Montreal
Hull Olympiques players
Chicoutimi Saguenéens (QMJHL) players
HC Milano Saima players
Canadian people of Italian descent